The Gondal Bar, named before the dominant caste in region (Gondal Jats), is a region between the rivers Chenab and Jhelum in Punjab, Pakistan. It is located in the northern part of Chaj Doab. "Bar", in the local language, means a forested area where there are no resources for cultivation, like water. Mandi Bahauddin District and some parts of Sargodha District and Gujrat District are known as Gondal Bar. It is a very fertile area. The Jats are the dominant people in the region.
Gondal Bar is a vast area with a number of Punjabi tribes sharing same culture and the Punjabi as other bars.
 language

References

Regions of Punjab, Pakistan